Ilya Albertovich Fedin (born May 6, 1989) is a Russian professional ice hockey winger who currently plays for Neftyanik Almetievsk of the Supreme Hockey League (VHL). He previously played for Atlant Moscow Oblast and HC Sochi of the Kontinental Hockey League (KHL).

Career statistics

References

External links

1989 births
Living people
Atlant Moscow Oblast players
Avangard Omsk players
Buran Voronezh players
Dizel Penza players
HC Izhstal players
HC Ryazan players
HC Sochi players
Molot-Prikamye Perm players
Neftyanik Almetyevsk players
Omskie Yastreby players
Russian ice hockey right wingers
Titan Klin players
Yermak Angarsk players
Zauralie Kurgan players